Jean Augustin or Jean-Augustin might refer to:

Jean-Fabrice Augustin, Mauritian footballer
Jean-Kévin Augustin (born 1997), French footballer
Jean Augustin Daiwaille (1786–1850), Dutch portrait painter
Jean-Marc Augustin (born 1965), French boxer